The 1992 Northern Iowa Panthers football team represented the University of Northern Iowa as a member of the Gateway Football Conference during the 1992 NCAA Division I-AA football season. Led by fourth-year head coach Terry Allen, the Panthers compiled an overall record of 12–2 with a mark of 5–1 in conference play, winning the Gateway title for the third consecutive season. Northern Iowa advanced to the NCAA Division I-AA Football Championship playoffs, where they beat  in the first round and McNeese State in the quarterfinals before falling to Youngstown State in the semifinals.

Schedule

References

Northern Iowa
Northern Iowa Panthers football seasons
Missouri Valley Football Conference champion seasons
Northern Iowa Panthers football